Figure skating at the 2010 Winter Olympics was held at the Pacific Coliseum in Vancouver, British Columbia, Canada. The events took place between 14 and 27 February 2010.

Shen Xue and Zhao Hongbo (CHN) won the gold medal in the pairs skating. This was the first time since 1960 that a Russian, Soviet, or Unified Team (CIS) flagged team did not win the gold medal.

Qualification

Skater eligibility
To be eligible for the 2010 Winter Games, skaters needed to be older than fifteen as of July 1, 2009 and had to be a citizen of the country they were representing. Unlike qualification rules for International Skating Union events, in the case of a pair or ice dance couple, both skaters were required to be citizens of the country they represented in competition. In addition, International Olympic Committee (IOC) rules required that at least three years had passed since the competitor(s) last represented another country in competition.

Skater qualification
There was no individual athlete qualification to the Olympics; the choice of which athlete(s) to send to the Games was left to the discretion of each country's National Olympic Committee (NOC).

Country qualification

The number of entries for the figure skating events at the Olympic Games was limited by a quota set by the IOC. There were 30 skaters in the disciplines of ladies' and men's singles, 20 pairs, and 24 ice dance couples.

Countries could qualify entries to the 2010 Winter Olympics in two different ways. The host country was guaranteed one spot in each event, if it had not already qualified an entry in that event. Every discipline qualified separately.

The majority of the country qualification took place at the 2009 World Figure Skating Championships, where countries qualified up to three entries in each discipline. The number of multiple entries was the same as usual for the World Championships; countries who earned multiple spots to the Olympics also earned multiple spots to the 2010 World Figure Skating Championships.

The multiple spots qualification to the Olympics from the World Championships was as follows:

The placement score did not directly correlate to the placement rank. In ice dance, if a couple did not qualify for the original dance from the compulsories, they were assigned 20 points. If an ice dance couple did not qualify for the free dance, or if a singles skater or pairs team did not qualify for the free skate, they were assigned 18 points. If a skater or team competed in the free skate or free dance and placed lower than 16, they were assigned 16 points. For those placing above 16th, the placement rank was the same as the placement score.

The results of the 2009 World Championships determined 83 total spots: 24 entries in each singles discipline, 16 in pairs, and 19 in ice dance. The available spots were awarded consecutively on moving down the results list, with the multiple spots being awarded first.

The remainder of the spots were filled at the 2009 Nebelhorn Trophy, held in the fall of 2009. Countries who had already earned an entry to the Olympics were not allowed to qualify more entries at this final qualifying competition.

If a country declined to use one or more of its spots, the vacated spot was awarded based on the results of the Nebelhorn Trophy.

Competition schedule

All times are Pacific Standard Time (UTC-8).

Medal summary

Events

Medal table

Entries

Records and firsts
The following new ISU best scores were set during this competition:

Other records and firsts:

Kim Yuna's gold medal was South Korea's first Olympic medal in figure skating.
Daisuke Takahashi's bronze medal was Japan's first Olympic medal in the men's event.
The pairs team of Shen Xue and Zhao Hongbo won China's first gold medal in figure skating, ending the twelve Olympics winning streak by Soviet and Russian pairs.
Canadians Tessa Virtue and Scott Moir became the first North American couple to win the ice dance title, ending Europe's 34-year streak. They were the youngest skaters ever to win the ice dance title (aged 20 and 22 years, respectively). They were also the first former World Junior Champion ice dance couple to win the Olympic gold medal, the first ice dance couple to win gold in an Olympic debut, and the first to win an Olympic gold medal on home ice.
Mao Asada (JPN) set a number of triple Axel firsts and records for the ladies' competition:
first to land a triple Axel during an Olympic short program;
first to perform a triple Axel as part of a jump combination in any Olympic figure skating program;
first to land multiple triple Axels during an Olympic competition;
first to land multiple triple Axels during a single program in any competition;
first to land three triple Axels in any competition;
set an Olympic record (and tied world record) for one triple Axel for short program;
set a world record for two triple Axels for free program;
set a world record for three triple Axels in the same competition.

Participating NOCs
Thirty-one nations contributed figure skaters to the events at Vancouver.

References

External links

 Vancouver 2010: Figure Skating 
  (See Rule 378 on p. 31 and Rule 400 on p. 36.)
Vancouver 2010 Olympic Winter Games Competition Schedule v12
 

 
2010 Winter Olympics events
2010
2010 in figure skating
Winter Olympics